This article includes several ranked indicators for Spain's 17 autonomous communities, as well as for the autonomous cities of Ceuta and Melilla.

Population and geography

Median Income
The following table shows the difference in median income for each of the 17 autonomous communities of Spain. The data was provided by Adecco and the INE. The wealthiest Spaniards are from the Basque Country, with a median income of €27,174. The poorest Spaniards reside in Extremadura, where median income is €18,662. The data was for 2016.

By GRDP
Spanish autonomies by gross regional domestic product (nominal) and by GRDP per capita in 2017, shown in euros and converted to United States dollars according to annual exchange rates.

See also
 List of Spanish autonomous communities by gross domestic product
 List of Spanish autonomous communities by Human Development Index
 Ranked lists of Spanish provinces
 Ranked lists of Spanish municipalities

References

External links
 National Institute of Statistics (Spain)

Spain
Autonomous communities of Spain
Autonomous communities, ranked

it:Comunità autonome della Spagna#Popolazione e superficie